Natel-e Restaq Rural District is a rural district (dehestan) in Chamestan District, Nur County, Mazandaran Province, Iran. As per the 2006 census, its population was 14,067, in 3,557 families. The rural district has 29 villages.

References 

Rural Districts of Mazandaran Province
Nur County